Sultan Abdullah Ma'ayat Shah was Sultan of Johor from 1615 to 1623.

History 
Before he became sultan of Johor, Abdullah Ma'ayat Shah was also known as Raja Bongsu, Raja Seberang or Raja di Ilir. According to the testimony of Dutch Admiral Cornelis Matelief de Jonge, Raja Bongsu was one of four surviving sons of Raja Ali bin Abdul Jalil (alias Raja Omar) of Johor. The other remaining male (half-) siblings were described by Admiral Matelief as Raja Siak, Raja Laut, and Alauddin Riayat Shah III. The latter ruled as the 6th sultan of Johor between the death of his father Raja Ali Jalla in 1597 and the Acehnese attack on Johor in 1613.

In 1603 Raja Bongsu was instrumental in forging the early diplomatic relations with the Dutch by lending assistance to Admiral Jacob van Heemskerk on 25 February 1603 in attacking and plundering the Portuguese carrack, the Santa Catarina, in the Johor River estuary off present-day Singapore. He was also responsible for sending one of the first diplomatic missions of a Malay ruler to the Dutch Republic in the same year. Headed by Megat Mansur, the Johor embassy sailed to Europe on the ships of Admiral van Heemskerk in 1603. Megat Mansur did not survive the voyage, but other members of the Johor embassy did and returned with the fleet under the command of Admiral Cornelis Matelief de Jonge in 1606. In that year, Raja Bongsu formally ratified two treaties with the Dutch (dated 17 May and 23 September 1606) and signed himself as the co-ruler of Johor. He also lent active assistance to Admiral Matelief during his seaborne attack on Portuguese Melaka in or around May 1606.

In early 1609 Raja Bongsu received Dutch Admiral Pieter Willemsz. Verhoeff at Batu Sawar. On this occasion one of the German officers serving in Verhoeff's fleet, one Johann Verken, described the physical appearance of Raja Bongsu. He wrote that the Raja was "a young man in his 30s. In his appearance and body a well-proportioned person, rather tall, articulate, and fair-skinned both on his body and on his face".

After the Portuguese had imposed an economically crippling blockade on the Johor River for much of the year 1609, Raja Bongsu was necessitated (through the machinations of his half-brother Raja Siak) to sign a peace treaty with the Portuguese Melaka in October 1610.

Described as his personal "fiefdom" by Admiral Matelieff, Raja Bongsu controlled the settlement of Kota Seberang which was located almost straight across the Johor River from the royal administrative center and capital Batu Sawar. He is also said to have controlled areas around the Sambas River on the island of Borneo.

In 1613, Raja Bongsu was one of the prisoners taken back to Aceh after the invasion of Johor by sultan Iskandar Muda. He was married to one of Iskandar's sisters, and returned to Johor as the new sultan. Raja Bongsu was subsequently enthroned as Abdullah Ma'ayat Shah of Johor. His half-brother Alauddin Riayat Shah III who had fallen from power at the time of Iskandar Muda's offensive on Johor in 1613 had fled to Lingga and probably died there in or around 1615.

In 1618, Abdullah Ma'ayat Shah moved to Lingga and gained the support of Orang Laut and the Dutch to wage a war against Aceh. He later divorced his wife who was also a sister of Iskandar Muda, a move that further angered the sultan. He spent most of his reign as a wanderer, pursued from town to town and island to island by the Acehnese. He died at Tambelan archipelago in March 1623.

References

Further reading
 Kwa, Chong Guan and Borschberg, Peter, eds., Studying Singapore before 1800, Singapore: NUS Press, 2018.
 
 
 Borschberg, Peter, Journal, Memorials and Letters of Cornelis Matelieff de Jonge. Security, Diplomacy and Commerce in 17th Century Southeast Asia, NUS Press, 2015.
 Borschberg, Peter, “Three questions about maritime Singapore, 16th and 17th Centuries”, Ler História, 72 (2018): 31-54. https://journals.openedition.org/lerhistoria/3234
 Borschberg, Peter, "The Seizure of the Santa Catarina Revisited: The Portuguese Empire in Asia, VOC Politics and the Origins of the Dutch-Johor Alliance (c. 1602–1616)", Journal of Southeast Asian Studies, 33.1 (2002): 31–62. (This article can be downloaded free of charge at www.cambridge.org)
 Borschberg, Peter, "The Singapore and Melaka Straits: Violence, Security and Diplomacy in the Seventeenth Century", Singapore: NUS Press, 2010.
 Borschberg, Peter, "Hugo Grotius, the Portuguese and Free Trade in the East Indies" NUS Press, 2011.
 Borschberg, Peter, "The Johor-VOC Alliance and the Twelve Years Truce. Factionalism, Intrigue and Diplomacy, c.1603–1613", Institute for International Law and Justice (IILJ) Working Paper, History and Theory of International Law Series, New York:  NYU, 8 (2009): 1–69. (This paper can be downloaded for free via www.ssrn.org or www.iilj.org)
 Borschberg, Peter, ed., "The Memoirs and Memorials of Jacques de Coutre. Security, Trade and Society in 17th-Century Southeast Asia",  Singapore: NUS Press, 2014. .
 Borschberg, Peter, ed., "Jacques de Coutre's Singapore and Johor, 1595-c.1625", Singapore: NUS Press, 2015. .
 Borschberg, Peter, ed., "Admiral Matelieff's Singapore and Johor, 1606–1616", Singapore, 2015.
 Borschberg, Peter, "The value of Admiral Matelieff's writings for the history of Southeast Asia, c.1600-1620", Journal of Southeast Asian Studies, 48(3), pp. 414–435. DOI
 Rouffaer, G.P., "Was Malaka Emporium vóór 1400 A.D. genaamd Malajoer? En waar lag Woerawari, Ma–Hasin, Langka, Batoesawar?", Bijdragen van het Koninklijk Instutuut voor Taal-, Letter- en Volkenkunde, vol. 77 (1921), pp. 1–174 and 359–604.

Sultans of Johor
1615 births
1623 deaths